Athol is a masculine given name. People with the name include:

 Athol Cooper (1892–1970), English-born Australian politician
 Joe Earl (born 1952 as Athol Earl), New Zealand former rower
 Athol Fugard (born 1932), South African playwright
 Athol Gill (1937–1992), Australian theologian
 Athol Guy (born 1940), member of Australian pop group The Seekers
 Athol Hodgetts (born 1951), former Australian rules football player and administrator
 Athol Johnson (born 1915), Australian lawn bowler
 Athol Layton (1921–1984), ring name Lord Athol Layton, English-Australian professional wrestler, amateur boxer and professional wrestling commentator
 Athol Meech (1907–1981), Canadian rower
 Athol Meyer (1940–1998), Australian journalist and politician
 Athelstane Athol Milne (1889–1946), Australian rules footballer
 Athol Murray (1892–1975), Canadian priest and educator, member of the Hockey Hall of Fame and Canada's Sports Hall of Fame as a builder
 Athol Rowan (1921–1998), South African cricketer
 Athol Shephard (1920–2006), Australian cricketer
 Athol Shmith (1914–1990), Australian photographer and photography educator
 Athol Smith (1915–1980), Australian rugby league footballer
 Athol Sharp (1894–1969), Australian rules footballer
 Athol Trollip (born 1964), South African politician
 Athol Tymms (1886–1949), Australian rules footballer
 Athol Webb (born 1935), former Australian rules footballer
 Athol Whimp (1961–2012) was a New Zealand mountaineer and rock climber
 Athol Williams (born 1970), South African poet and social philosopher

References 

Masculine given names